Anisopodus andicola is a species of beetle in the family Cerambycidae that was described by Theodor Franz Wilhelm Kirsch in 1889.

References

Anisopodus
Beetles described in 1889